Luzuriagaceae is a family of flowering plants that was recognized in the 1998 APG system and the 2003 APG II system. The 2009 APG III system merged this small family into the Alstroemeriaceae in the order Liliales, in the clade monocots

External links
Luzuriagaceae in L. Watson and M.J. Dallwitz (1992 onwards). The families of flowering plants: descriptions, illustrations, identification, information retrieval. Version: 9 March 2006. http://delta-intkey.com 
NCBI Taxonomy Browser

Historically recognized angiosperm families